David Gordon Nathan (born May 25, 1929) is a pediatrician and hematologist.  He is known for his authorship of Nathan and Oski's Hematology of Infancy and Childhood, a standard reference in pediatrics, currently in its seventh edition. Nathan remains an author on the current edition. Now retired, he was Robert A. Stranahan professor of pediatrics at Harvard Medical School and served as president of the Dana–Farber Cancer Institute. He was born in Boston.

He graduated from Harvard Medical School.

Awards and honors
2003 John Howland Award
1990 National Medal of Science
2006 George Kober Medal Association of American Physicians
2010 Honorary Doctor of Science Harvard University
2011 Wallace Coulter Award American Society of Hematology

References

Sources

External links 
David G. Nathan papers, 1949-2007 (inclusive), 1980-2007 (bulk), HMS c386. Harvard Medical Library, Francis A. Countway Library of Medicine, Center for the History of Medicine, Harvard Medical School

Harvard Medical School faculty
American hematologists
American pediatricians
National Medal of Science laureates
Living people
1929 births
Harvard Medical School alumni
American hospital administrators
Presidents of the American Society of Hematology
Members of the National Academy of Medicine